"Burning" is the second single released from Maria Arredondo's album Not Going Under. It was released in September 2004 and was the second Arredondo single to become a video.

Track listing
Norwegian radio single
 "Burning" – 03:59

Charts

Trivia
Professional DOTA player Zhi Lei "BurNIng" Xu chose his ID from this song after being introduced to it by his first girlfriend.

References 

Maria Arredondo songs
2004 singles
2004 songs